Balázs Erdélyi (born 16 February 1990) is a water polo player from Hungary. He was part of the Hungarian team at the 2016 Summer Olympics, where the team was eliminated in the quarterfinals.

Erdélyi participated in college water polo at the University of the Pacific where he won back to back Cutino awards (best player in college water polo) and helped Pacific establish themselves as a top tier program.

See also
 Hungary men's Olympic water polo team records and statistics
 List of World Aquatics Championships medalists in water polo

References

External links
 

Hungarian male water polo players
Living people
1990 births
Water polo players at the 2016 Summer Olympics
Pacific Tigers men's water polo players
Sportspeople from Eger
Universiade medalists in water polo
Universiade gold medalists for Hungary
Medalists at the 2013 Summer Universiade
Water polo players at the 2020 Summer Olympics
Medalists at the 2020 Summer Olympics
Olympic bronze medalists for Hungary in water polo
20th-century Hungarian people
21st-century Hungarian people